Rashid Chidi Gumbo (born 14 October 1988 in Dar es Salaam) is a retired Tanzanian football midfielder.

Career
Gumbo played for Mtibwa Sugar F.C. before signing in 2009 for African Lyon. During the 2009-10 Tanzanian Premier League season, Gumbo scored two goals in eight games and received only a yellow card.

International career
He played his first international football game for the Tanzania national football team against the Rwanda national football team in August 2009. The game was played at Stade Amahoro in Kigali, Rwanda. Gumbo scored the game-winning goal as the game finished 1–2 for Tanzania.

References

External links
 

1988 births
Living people
People from Dar es Salaam
Tanzanian footballers
Tanzania international footballers
Tanzanian expatriate footballers
Expatriate footballers in Seychelles
La Passe FC players
Mtibwa Sugar F.C. players
African Lyon F.C. players
Simba S.C. players
Young Africans S.C. players
Singida United F.C. players
Anse Réunion FC players

Association football midfielders
Tanzanian Premier League players